Byssochlamys is a genus of fungi in the Trichocomaceae family. First described by Swedish botanist Richard Westling in 1909, the widespread genus contains four species associated with food spoilage, especially acidic heat-processed foods.

Species of the genus Byssochlamys can produce the mycotoxin patulin in fruit juices, as well as byssochlamic acid and mycophenolic acid.

References

Trichocomaceae
Eurotiomycetes genera
Taxa described in 1909